Jayanti Devi Temple lies at Jayanti Majri village hillock, which is 15 km from Chandigarh in Mohali district of Punjab.

History

Etymology
Named after Jayanti, the goddess of victory. The Pandavas built a temple to Jayanti Devi around which came up the town of Jayantipuri.

Formation of Chandigarh
When the new Chandigarh project was conceived, Jayanti Majri was among the villages to be included in it because it lies at the periphery of Chandigarh. The Punjab Soil and Water Conservation Department has constructed a small dam, Jayanti Dam, in this area, that supports a reservoir for rain water collection. The water is then used for irrigation of fields. The place can be developed as a beautiful tourist-cum-religious spot and visitors to Chandigarh can be guided to visit the temple.

Oral tradition
The oral tradition of the temple of Mata Jayanti Devi goes back about 550 years to the times of Lodi dynasty. At that time, a small estate called Hathnaur was situated at the north of present-day Chandigarh. The king of the estate had 22 brothers. One of the brother was married to the daughter of the King of Kangra. She was a great devotee of Mata Jayanti Devi,  the mother goddess of the clan, since her childhood. Every morning she first used to worship the goddess and only after that she would perform other activities. When her marriage was fixed she was very anxious because it meant going far away from her deity and not being able to have darshan of the goddess. She prayed hard and conveyed her grief and remorse to the goddess. Mata Jayanti Devi was moved by the deep devotion of the girl. She appeared in her dreams and promised to accompany her wherever she went.

When the marriage party started back from Hathnaur with the bride’s doli, a miracle happened. Suddenly the doli turned very heavy. Neither the traditional kahars nor the king’s men could move it. At this, the bride told her father about her dream. The king, then, bowing to the desire of the divine arranged for another doli, kept the idol in it and sent the goddess with his daughter. The pujari and his family followed the goddess. The king of Hathnaur, established a temple for the Devi on a hillock in his estate. First, the girl, and later succeeding generations of the family, worshipped the deity for 200 years. 

At that time, a robber called Garibu or Garibdas extended his influence on this part of the region, including Mullanpur (now in Ropar). Gradually, Garibu captured the Hathnaur estate and started his reign. However, Garibu was a friend of the poor and a great devotee of Mata. He renovated the temple and extended the premises to the present state.

Significance
She is one of the seven sisters, the seven goddesses of the Kangra valley: Naina Devi, Jawalamukhi, Chintpurni, Mata Mansa Devi, Brajeshwari, Chamunda Devi and Jayanti Devi. As a sign of reverence to Mata Jayanti Devi, the villagers of Jayanti Majri restrict the construction of their houses to only a single storey. An ancient well at the base of the temple provides sweet water throughout the year. Jayanti Devi is considered to be a very sensitive and benevolent goddess who listens to the prayers of her devotees.

Geography
The metalled road leading to the temple is lined with wheat or rice fields, keekar, peepal and mango groves. As far as the vision goes, one can see numerous hues of green, the characteristic feature of the fertile lands of Punjab, small and large ponds with clear water reflecting the blue sky and tiny hamlets with agriculture-based life style. The undulating topography and hump-like hillocks give the place a mysterious character that is absent in the flat planes of Chandigarh.

There is only a single bus service from Chandigarh to Jayanti Majri. That too is erratic. Though the Chandigarh Administration arranges for buses during the February fair, for the convenience of the village residents and for visitors, a regular bus service is needed, especially on Sundays and holidays.

Temple complex
Temple has a large complex with park and Jayanti Archeological Museum.

The entrance to the temple is through a huge gate at the base of the hillock. From here about 100 or so easy steps lead up to the temple premises. As one climbs up, the first thing one encounters is a very large water tank, a traditional feature of Indian temples. This tank was earlier in use. It is a concrete construction and steps lead down to it from two sides. The other two sides are bound by the rocky wall of the hillock. There are a few shops along the steps selling nicknacks — coconut, red net chunnies, fancy jewellery, cassettes of devotional songs, toys, photos of the idol etc. The temple is at the highest point of the hillock supported by massive pillars. This point gives a wide view of the lush green surroundings, the serpentine Jayanti Rao and the settlements beyond. Inside the sanctum sanctorum lies the stone idol of the goddess. In the niches outside there are Murtis of Lord Shiva, Lord Ganesha, Goddess Lakshmi, Goddess Bala Sundari and local deity Lokda Dev.

There is a very famous fast food (veg) shop named Anika's Food Point offering and serving delicious eateries at very affordable price and maintaining qualitative professionalism. It is a shop where a duo of father and son serves customers as if at home.

Fairs
The temple attracts visitors during a grand fair held here on Purnima day in February and a small fair in August. At that time approximately 1.5 lakh people visit the temple from far and near places.

Devotees also visit it during Navratras, other auspicious days and on Sundays. Two committees run the management of the temple. One of them comprises the priest’s family and villagers of Jayanti Majri. It looks after construction work and expansion projects of the temple. The other committee consists of residents of Mullanpur. Both the committees hold Bhandara/ Dhaam every Sunday and also during the fair. There is no government-aid to the temple and the only source of income is contribution by the devotees. At present, there is a provision of night stay at the premises for a limited number of devotees. The committee has started work on the construction of a dharamshala for pilgrims who visit the temple from far-off places. The 11th generation of the pujari, who came originally from Kangra with the Murti, now performs the sacred duties of the temple. The residence of the Pujari is also within the premises.

References

External links

Hindu temples in Punjab, India
Hindu temples in Haryana